David Anthony Higgins (born 19 August 1961, Liverpool) is a footballer who played as a defender for Eagles, Tranmere Rovers, South Liverpool, Caernarfon Town and Barrow.

References

1961 births
Living people
Footballers from Liverpool
Association football defenders
English footballers
Tranmere Rovers F.C. players
South Liverpool F.C. players
Caernarfon Town F.C. players
Barrow A.F.C. players
English Football League players
Outfield association footballers who played in goal